= St. Mary's County =

St. Mary's County may refer to:

- St. Mary's County, Maryland
- St. Mary's County, Utah Territory, now part of Nevada
